Several bridges are known as the Millennium Bridge:
 in the United Kingdom
Gateshead Millennium Bridge
 Lune Millennium Bridge, Lancaster
 Millennium Bridge, Glasgow
 Millennium Bridge, London
 Millennium Bridge (Salford Quays)
 Teesquay Millennium Footbridge, Stockton-on-Tees
 Millennium Bridge, York
 in the Republic of Ireland
Millennium Bridge (Dublin), a footbridge across the River Liffey in Dublin
 in Montenegro
Millennium Bridge (Podgorica)
 in Poland
Third Millennium John Paul II Bridge, Gdansk
 in the United States
Denver Millennium Bridge, Denver, Colorado
 BP Pedestrian Bridge, Chicago, Illinois
 in Russia
Millennium Bridge (Kazan)